The 2008 Draft may refer to:

The 2008 AFL Draft
The 2008 NBA Draft
The 2008 NFL Draft
The 2008 NHL Entry Draft
The 2008 WNBA Draft
The 2008 WWE Draft